Haru is a Korean word that means "day" in Korean.

Haru is also a Japanese word that means "spring (season)".
 
Haru may also refer to:
Haru (woreda), a woreda (district) in Ethiopia
Haru (given name), a unisex Japanese given name
Haru (actress), Japanese actress and model
List of Rave Master characters#Haru Glory
List of Reborn! characters#Haru Miura
Haru Okumura, a character from Persona 5
List of Fruits Basket characters#Hatsuharu Soma
Haru (1996 film), a Japanese film
Hal (2013 film), a Japanese film
Yoshida Haru, a male protagonist from the anime My Little Monster
Chikurin-in, Sanada Yukimura's wife.
List of Ressha Sentai ToQger characters#Tokatti
Tsuritama#Main characters #Haru
Haru Glory, from Rave Master
Haru, male protagonist of 2019 Korean drama Extraordinary You 
Haru, a principal fictional character in Beverly Hills Ninja